Corporate is a 2006 Indian Hindi-language drama film directed by Madhur Bhandarkar, starring Bipasha Basu, Kay Kay Menon, Payal Rohatgi, Minissha Lamba and Raj Babbar. The film is about the power game between two powerful industrialists.

Plot
Corporate centers around the power games between two industrialists, The Sehgal Group of Industries (SGI) owned by Vinay Sehgal and the Marwah Group of Industries (MGI) owned by Dharmesh Marwah. The two companies are traditional rivals in the food and beverages products business. Nishigandha "Nishi" Dasgupta is the vice-president of SGI, while Vinay Sehgal's brother-in-law Ritesh joins in later as senior vice president.

Ashwini, a politician backed by Sehgal, become the Union Finance Minister, which helps the Sehgal Group to enter a lucrative partnership with international food products giants Friscon.

In a CII meeting, the state Finance Minister Gulabrao declares that a public sector unit (PSU) is for sale. Both the companies pounce into the competition using every tactic they have to outperform each other. But last-minute politicking by Marwah with Gulabrao leads to the PSU going to the Marwah Group, leaving Sehgal disappointed.
 
However, Nishi charms Marwah Group's CEO Pervez, and is then able to steal critical information from his laptop computer: she finds out that Marwah had been misleading the media that they were planning to manufacture mineral water in the plant, whereas in reality they were planning to manufacture a mint-based soft drink. The Sehgal Group publicly announces that they will be launching their own mint-based soft drink, which they've named "Just Chill", pre-empting the Marwah Group's planned launch. Marwah traces the leak to Pervez and fires him.

Ten days before the launch of the drink, Sehgal learns that the FDA has found the presence of a large amount of pesticides in the drink. But Sehgal, cold-heartedly, decides to launch the product by bribing the FDA agents, but CEO Naveen resigns from the SGI. The drink is a great success, but another of SGI's executive is unhappy that Ritesh is being made the CEO, and he gives Marwah the information that SGI's product contains pesticides. Marwah along with Gulabrao blow up the issue in the media, leading to a raid on the SGI plants and a case on the Sehgals. Sehgal decides that the only solution is for an employee of SGI who is not a member of the Sehgal family to take the blame for the blunder. Nishi is chosen for that role.

Ritesh is called on by his sister Chayya Sehgal, where she asks him to convince Nishi to sacrifice for the company. Initially disagreeing, Ritesh agrees to convince Nishi on the insistence of Sehgal as he promises that Nishi would be released by the Enquiry Commission soon. A foreign investor holding major stake in Friscon, urges Ashwini to settle the dispute between the two as this would lead to capital flight and foreign investors will pull back their investments, causing serious havoc in the business market. Ashwini discusses the issue with Gulabrao and both the ministers mediates between Marwah and Sehgal to settle down the issue. Marwah agrees to withdraw all the allegations suited through NGO's and drawing their limitations in Friscon company. However, Gulabrao refuses to release Nishi as it would dent his chances of chief minister-ship as elections roars near.

Meanwhile, Ritesh learns that Nishi is pregnant with his baby. Ritesh, angry about it, threatens to expose Sehgal in front of the media if Nishi is not released within 48 hours. The next day he is found dead, having fallen from the terrace of his apartment building. It is assumed to be suicide but some think otherwise. The movie ends with the narrator concluding that Marwah and Sehgal are living happily in their world, whereas there is no place of emotions in corporate world as Nishi is the victim of the corporate tactics. The film shows Nishi still fighting the case after two years of the incident with her child.

Cast

 Bipasha Basu as Nishigandha Dasgupta
 Kay Kay Menon as Ritesh Sahani
 Rajat Kapoor as Vinay Sehgal
 Raj Babbar as Dharmesh Marwah
 Minissha Lamba as Megha Apte
 Sameer Dattani as Anmol Rawat
 Harsh Chhaya as Naveen Shroff
 Bharat Dabholkar as Joe Rajan
 Kevin Green as Mr.Steve Jones
 Sandeep Mehta as Parvez Merchant
 Achint Kaur as Vinay Sehgal's wife
 Lilette Dubey as Devyani bakshi
 Ashok Pandit as Ashok Pandit (journalist)
 Manoj Joshi as Monty (movie director)
 Shweta Menon as Archana
 Anil Nagrath as Ballu
 Amar Talwar as Anand Ruia
 Vinay Apte as Gulabrao
 Mukesh Tyagi
 Viju Khote as Megha's father
 Navni Parihar as Dharmesh's wife
 Dolly Thakore
 Suhas Avchat
 Brinda Parekh
 Hamsa Nandini
 Sunayana Fauzdar
 Bikramjeet Kanwarpal
 Girish Oak as Ashwini Dayal
 Manohar Kanungo in a special appearance
 Kailash Kher as special appearance in the song "O Sikander"
 Javed Akhtar as Himself
 Pralhad Kakkar in a special appearance
 Vasundhara Das as Herself
 Payal Rohatgi as Item number
 Atul Kulkarni as Narrator

Soundtrack
The music was scored by Shamir Tandon and the lyrics were penned by Sandeep Nath.

Reception 
A critic from BBC wrote that "a provocative social commentary, with all the elements of good filmmaking keenly in evidence, the portrait painted of the corporate world is deeply disturbing. For all its startling realism the film is intensely watchable". A critic from Rediff.com wrote that "with its urban premise, intricate dialogue and stark realism, Corporate might not be a box office smash. It's still a smart, gripping, honest film. And that should count for something". A critic from The Times of India recommended the film to "watch it for its topicality and the novelty of the story".

Awards 
Bipasha Basu won the following awards for best actress:
 2007: GIFA Best Actress
 2007: Bollywood Movie Award – Best Actress
 2007: Anadalok Purashkar Award, Best Actress
 2007: Anand Bazar Patrika Award, Best Actress

She received further nominations for Star Screen Awards, Filmfare Awards and Zee Cine Awards. Kay Kay Menon was also nominated for GIFA Best Supporting Actor.

References

External links 
 

2006 films
2006 drama films
Indian drama films
2000s Hindi-language films
2000s business films
Films directed by Madhur Bhandarkar
Films scored by Shamir Tandon
Hindi-language drama films